The Musée des Arts et Métiers (French for Museum of Arts and Crafts) is an industrial design museum in Paris that houses the collection of the Conservatoire national des arts et métiers, which was founded in 1794 as a repository for the preservation of scientific instruments and inventions.

History
Today the museum, which underwent major renovation in 1990, includes an additional building adjacent to the abbey, with larger objects remaining in the abbey itself.

Collection
The museum has over 80,000 objects and 15,000 drawings in its collection, of which about 2,500 are on display in Paris. The rest of the collection is preserved in a storehouse in Saint-Denis. Among its collection is an original version of the Foucault pendulum, the original model of Liberty Enlightening the World (commonly known as the Statue of Liberty) by Frédéric Auguste Bartholdi, some of the first planes (Clément Ader's Avion III, Louis Blériot's Blériot XI...), and Blaise Pascal's Pascaline (the first mechanical calculator).

The museum presents seven different collections : Scientific Instruments, Materials, Energy, Mechanics, Construction, Communication, Transportation. In the former church of St-Martin-des-Champs Priory are displayed cars, planes, the Foucault Pendulum and some other monumental objects.

Cultural references
The museum appears in literature as the scene of the climax of the 1988 novel Foucault's Pendulum by Umberto Eco, and is featured in the 2019 documentary film about the Statue of Liberty, Liberty: Mother of Exiles.

Transportation
The museum can be accessed by the Paris Métro station Arts et Métiers. (The museum's entrance is at the corner of Rue Réaumur and Rue Vaucanson.)

See also 
 List of museums in Paris
 Nicolas-Joseph Cugnot's fardier (a pioneering steam-powered road vehicle) is an exhibit

References

External links 

 Official site 
 Official site 

Arts et Metiers, Musee des
Buildings and structures in the 3rd arrondissement of Paris
Science museums in France
Technology museums in France
Museums established in 1794
1794 establishments in France
Statue of Liberty
ms:Musée des Arts et Métiers